Lionel Clarke (born 11 October 1972) is an English cricketer. He played two first-class matches for Cambridge University Cricket Club in 1995.

See also
 List of Cambridge University Cricket Club players

References

External links
 

1972 births
Living people
English cricketers
Cambridge University cricketers
Cricketers from Sheffield
English cricketers of 1969 to 2000